Oguzer (Ögiz-Yer) is a rural locality (a selo) in Kizlyarsky District, Republic of Dagestan, Russia. The population was 871 as of 2010. There are 10 streets.

Geography 
Oguzer is located 43 km northeast of Kizlyar (the district's administrative centre) by road. Sar-Sar and Novaya Serebryakovka are the nearest rural localities.

Nationalities 
Nogais, Avars, Chechens, Tabasarans, Dargins, Kumyks and Kazakhs live there.

References 

Rural localities in Kizlyarsky District